Ayub Teaching Hospital (Urdu, Hindko: , , abbreviated as ATH), is a public sector, non-profit tertiary level academic health sciences centre located in Abbottabad, Khyber Pakhtunkhwa, Pakistan. Established in 1995, ATH has one of the largest trauma centres in the region serving the northeastern districts of Khyber Pakhtunkhwa, southern Gilgit-Baltistan and the northern districts of Azad Jammu & Kashmir. The hospital also serves as the chief teaching hospital of Ayub Medical College.

Patient care
ATH employs more than 500 in-house physicians including 60 residents (fellows) and 200 nurses. It is part of a consortium of hospitals which operates in Khyber Pakhtunkhwa and is the primary teaching hospital for Ayub Medical College.

Teaching
ATH is the principal teaching affiliate of Ayub Medical College and the School of Nursing. Every member of the hospital medical and dental staff holds an academic appointment at the hospital and operates numerous residency training programs as well as resident and fellowship positions.

Staffing
There is around 3500 members of staff working at ATH. About 800 doctors are employed at the hospital, including senior doctors, trainees and house officers. Other staff members includes paramedics, nurses, and allied health professionals.

Wards
neurology

Administration
ATH is an autonomous body of the provincial government of Khyber Pakhtunkhwa and is headed by a chief executive appointed by the government. The chain of command includes:

See also
 Khyber Teaching Hospital
 Saidu Teaching Hospital

References

External links
Ayub Teaching Hospital
 Ayub Medical College
Ayub Alumni Website

Hospitals in Khyber Pakthunkhwa
Hospital buildings completed in 1998
Hospitals established in 1998
Teaching hospitals in Pakistan
Buildings and structures in Abbottabad